Gorgan County is in Golestan province, Iran. The capital of the county is the city of Gorgan. At the 2006 census, the county's population was 393,887 in 105,120 households.The following census in 2011 counted 462,455 people in 135,112 households. At the 2016 census, the county's population was 480,541 in 150,649 households.

Administrative divisions

The population history and structural changes of Gorgan County's administrative divisions over three consecutive censuses are shown in the following table. The latest census shows two districts, five rural districts, and three cities.

References

 

Counties of Golestan Province